The 2019 Newfoundland and Labrador Women's Curling Championship, the women's provincial curling championship for Newfoundland and Labrador, was held from January 10 to 12 at the Bally Haly Golf & Curling Club in St. John's, Newfoundland and Labrador. The winning Sharpe team represented Newfoundland and Labrador at the 2019 Scotties Tournament of Hearts in Sydney, Nova Scotia.

The event featured a brand new champion, as none of the skips that entered have won the provincial championship as a skip before.

Teams
Teams are as follows:

Round-robin standings

Round-robin results

January 10
Draw 1
Dunne 9-3 Glynn
Ward 8-7 Trickett 
Sharpe 7-6 Hill 

Draw 2
Trickett 9-4 Hill
Sharpe 8-2 Glynn 
Ward 11-5 Dunne

January 11
Draw 3
Sharpe 11-5 Dunne 
Ward 9-8 Hill 
Glynn 8-7 Trickett

January 12
Draw 4
Sharpe 8-2 Ward
Trickett 8-3 Dunne 
Hill 8-4 Glynn 

Draw 5
Ward 9-8 Glynn 
Hill 11-6 Dunne 
Trickett 8-4 Sharpe

Final
Sunday, January 13, 2:30pm

References

Newfoundland and Labrador
Sport in St. John's, Newfoundland and Labrador
Curling in Newfoundland and Labrador
2019 in Newfoundland and Labrador
January 2019 sports events in Canada